Melissa, previously published as George until April 2022, is a children's novel about a young transgender girl written by American author Alex Gino. The novel tells the story of Melissa, a fourth-grade girl who is struggling to be herself to the rest of the world. The rest of the world sees Melissa as George, a boy. Melissa uses the class play, Charlotte's Web, to show her mom that she is a girl by switching roles with her best friend, and playing the part of Charlotte. Scholastic first published the novel on August 25, 2015, and it has had a mixed reaction because of its LGBT+ content. In 2021, Gino retitled the novel Melissa.

The novel has received positive feedback from sources such as the New York Times and the National Public Radio for its inclusion of transgender experiences. However, the book has remained controversial to some parents and teachers, leading it to be listed on the American Library Association's list of the 10 Most Challenged Books of 2016, 2017, 2018, 2019, and 2020 (topping the list in 2018, 2019, and 2020). Common reasons for challenging the book include its sexual references and conflict with "traditional family structure," with some saying schools and libraries should not "put books in a child's hand that require discussion." It ultimately became the fifth-most banned book between 2010 and 2020.

Background 

Alex Gino wrote the novel "because it was the book [they] wanted to read" growing up. Gino also wanted to write it because they noticed a lack of transgender middle-grade literature aimed for 3rd-grade to 7th-grade, and they hoped the book would "help transgender children feel less alone." They wanted to fill this need and teach children about these issues. The novel simultaneously is meant to teach non-transgender children to be tolerant of trans people and show children who are trans that there are other people like them going through similar experiences.

Gino started their work on the book, then titled Girl George, in 2003 and made frequent draft revisions before publication to adjust to the changing social environment toward trans people. It had an initial press run in 2015 of 50,000 copies under Scholastic, and was sent out to over 10,000 teachers and children's librarians. In the future Gino wants Melissa to become "historical fiction."

Plot 
The novel follows Melissa, a transgender girl, whose family and the rest of the world sees as George. Melissa is in the fourth grade. Her class is about to begin their production of Charlotte's Web. Auditions are fast approaching, and the class rules are that each girl will audition for the role of Charlotte and each boy will audition for the role of Wilbur, the pig. Melissa wants to audition for the role of Charlotte. When Melissa gets called out into the hall and does her audition as Charlotte, her teacher, Ms. Udell, thinks Melissa is making a joke and tells Melissa that she cannot play the role of Charlotte, because Melissa is a boy. Since Melissa does not want to play a role other than Charlotte and Ms. Udell said that was not an option, Melissa takes a role in the stage crew. Meanwhile, at home, Melissa's mom finds her secret collection of female magazines. Melissa's mother views her actions as childish and says that she does not want to see Melissa wearing girl clothing, shoes, or going in her room at all. Back at school, Melissa is still upset with Ms. Udell's reaction to her audition. In addition, she feels distant from her friend Kelly because Kelly got the role of Charlotte. However, as the classes' efforts to prepare for the upcoming production increased, Melissa finds a way to become the "Charlotte" of the stage crew by playing a supportive role for her friend. Inspired by Charlotte's courage, she gains the confidence to tell Kelly that she is a girl. After processing this news, Kelly is supportive of her best friend Melissa, and her efforts to tell the world she is a girl. One afternoon, as the stage crew is working on the set, Jeff, the class bully, says that if he met a talking spider he would step on it. Melissa feels the instinct to protect Charlotte and paints "SOME JERK" on a piece of paper and drops it on Jeff's back, painting his sweatshirt with the words.  After Jeff sees the damage, he punches Melissa to punish her for ruining his favorite sweatshirt, causing her to vomit on him. As a result of the fight, both Melissa and Jeff are in trouble with their teachers. However, in the process of getting punished, Melissa discovers that the principal is sympathetic to transgender people.

Later in the evening, when Melissa's mom questions her about the magazines, Melissa reveals to her mom that she is a girl. Her mom disregards her feelings, crushing Melissa in the process. On the other hand, when Melissa tells her brother Scott that she is a girl, he thinks her feelings match her behavior, and he offers his help and understanding to her. The night before the performance, Kelly and Melissa devise a plan for Melissa to be Charlotte in the play, which will help show the world that she is a girl. Kelly will perform in the morning, and Melissa will perform at the evening show. Melissa does an excellent job performing as Charlotte and receives many compliments for her performance from classmates and the principal. Her mom is initially shocked at this performance but the performance later helps her become a more supportive and understanding mom to Melissa.

After the excitement of the performance, Melissa feels more comfortable with herself. When Kelly invites her to spend the day with her uncle at the zoo, Melissa takes this opportunity to show herself as she chooses because she will be surrounded by people who do not already know her as George. Dressed in Kelly's clothing, she and Kelly happily enjoy the day at the zoo.

Genre 
Melissa falls under several genres of literature. The intended reader is eight to twelve years old. It is a fictional novel that falls under the genres of children and LGBTQ+ literature. This novel contributes to the small but growing repertoire of middle-grade literature about gender and sexual identity.

Publication 
Gino started their work on the book in 2003, and the novel underwent several drafts before its August 2015 release. Gino worked closely with editors Jean Marie Stine and with David Levithan from Scholastic Corporation. One of the major edits to Gino's work was the title; the original title was Girl George (a reference to Boy George), but Scholastic changed it to George during the editing process. Before the commercial release, Scholastic sent over 10,000 copies to teachers in the United States which received mixed, but largely positive feedback. The teachers and librarians who opposed the novel argued that children are too young to be discussing these issues. However, the positive feedback convinced Scholastic to increase the first printing order from 35,000 to 50,000.

Scholastic Press and Scholastic UK prints copies in both hardcover and softcover. Translated copies can be found in English, Spanish, French, Catalan, Chinese Complex, Danish, Dutch, German, Italian, Japanese, Portuguese, Swedish and Vietnamese. Jamie Clayton, a transgender actress, narrated the audio book. Gino felt it was important to have "trans voices to telling trans stories" to make the story feel genuine.

In 2021, Gino and Scholastic changed the title of the novel from George to Melissa, saying they shouldn't have titled it with a name that "the main character does not like or want to use for herself". Gino initially suggested Melissa's Story as the new title of the novel, with Scholastic then choosing to shorten it to Melissa. Scholastic plans to start publishing an edition of the novel bearing the new title in April 2022 in the United States.

Reception 
The novel has been received with mixed reactions since its publication. While the book has been routinely challenged for several years, it has also received various awards and praise for its content.  The School Library Journal, in a starred review, wrote that it is "a required purchase" for readers interested in middle-grade literature. It was also commended in the form of a National Public Radio review, where doctoral student in transgender studies J. Wallace Skelton praised Alex Gino for their refusal to let Melissa's bullies define her character. Skelton said it belonged among the ranks of the best children's literature for its skillful telling of the story of a young kid finding their place in the world. Skelton specifically admires how Gino points out that Melissa is not powerless when she faces her bullies, and that the novel as a whole "is a narrative about a young person who is very much trying to become who they are."

In his 2015 New York Times review, children's author Tim Federle described the novel's depictions of the moments in which Melissa's family members and friends realize she is a girl as "refreshing" and "brilliant." Federle also stated that it stood out from other LGBTQ+ Children's literature because of the novel's inclusion of Charlotte's Web. Federle stated "if someone can not believe that someone can be transgender just has to remember that a farm of talking animals was believable." Mel Morrow also strongly praised Alex Gino in her Lambda Literary book review, proclaiming the novel was a "life-saving book" and commending it for encouraging acceptance among its readers through intimate glimpses into Melissa's struggle with coming out to her friends and family. The book received the 2015 Lambda Literary Award as a result.

Jennifer Laughran of the Andrea Brown Literacy Group also praised it, referring to Gino's approach to gender issues in children's literature as "ground breaking." It was honored with the Stonewall Children's Book award in 2016 for its positive depiction of LGBT+ content. That same year, the book also won the Children's Choice Book Award for a Debut Author, and the Gold Medal award for juvenile fiction in the California Book Awards.

Although the book has been widely praised and received various awards, it has also been the subject of public criticism. In a 2019 article in the Journal of Children's Literature, authors and literacy scholars Jill M. Hermann-Wilmarth and Caitlin L. Ryan argued that the book's focus on a white transgender character prevents the novel from accurately encapsulating the struggles of transgender people who are marginalized in more ways than just their gender identity. They also pointed out that Melissa expresses her identity as a girl in very traditionally feminine ways, such as by wearing dresses and makeup, thereby shutting people who do not strictly fit into the gender binary out of the novel's representation of transgender identity. Skelton also criticized the book's original title of George, arguing that it does not support Melissa's true identity as a female by deadnaming her. In the summer of 2021, Gino apologised to the character and the trans community for the title and began changing the title to Melissa's Story when signing the book, with Gino and Scholastic officially changing the book's title to Melissa later in 2021. 

The book has appeared on the American Library Association's Top Ten Most Challenged Book list every year since 2016, a year after its publication. In 2016, it was listed at number three; in 2017 it was listed at number five; and in 2018, 2019, and 2020, it was listed at number one. It became the fifth-most banned book between 2010 and 2020.  Even though it has been challenged repeatedly, the reasons for this have changed. In 2016 and 2017, the book was challenged because of its inclusion of a transgender child whose "sexuality was not appropriate at elementary levels".  In 2018, the book was challenged because it was believed to "encourage children to clear browser history and change their bodies using hormones".  In 2019, the piece was challenged for its LGBT+ content, use of sexual references, and for conflicting "traditional family structure". In 2020, it was challenged for not reflecting "the values of our community".

Parents, teachers, and school districts have challenged the book because it features a transgender girl, her older brother's discussion of age inappropriate material (i.e., sexual references), inclusion of LGBT+ content, as well as the book's conflict with a specific religious viewpoint and "traditional family structures". In response to the challenge concerning the protagonist's brother, Scott, Gino believes that people are using the case against Melissa's brother to hide their underlying issues with the transgender girl. Challengers state that schools and libraries should not "put books in a child's hand that require discussion". The book's mention of "dirty magazines" is also a popular reason for it being challenged.

A particular controversy surrounding the book involved the Wichita, Kansas public school system and its decision to ban the book from its district libraries in 2017. The justification used for this banning was that the book included sexual references and language considered to be inappropriate for children. The district's supervisor of library media at the time, Gail Becker, obstructed district librarians’ efforts to include the book in their collections by withholding funds intended to purchase the book. In response to this challenge, Alex Gino organized a Twitter campaign intended to raise money to purchase enough copies of their book so that each of the district's 57 elementary and K-8 school libraries could have one. A separate controversy surrounding the novel took place a year later in King City, Oregon. This incident involved the Tigard-Tualatin School District's decision to consider requiring a signed permission slip from parents before letting its elementary school students read it.

2018–2019 Oregon Battle of the Books controversy 

Melissa was selected to be one of 16 texts for the 2018–19 season of Oregon Battle of the Books for elementary students. However, officials from two school districts within Oregon withdrew their students from the competition as a result of the transgender protagonist and plot of the novel.

Analysis 
Allyship is a major theme in Melissa. Gino said in an interview at an Ann Arbor bookstore that they wrote Melissa to guide family, friends, teachers and students alike in better sympathizing with the experiences of transgender children. In their 2019 article in the Journal of Children's Literature, Jill M. Hermann-Wilmarth and Caitlin L. Ryan contended that the novel instructs readers on how to be better allies for their transgender friends and peers through its focus on Melissa's interactions with other characters and the impact they have on her. How Melissa is either hurt or helped by these interactions in her coming-out process can help readers create safe spaces for transgender people to express their identities in real life. A book on the inclusion of queer adolescent literature in English Language Arts classes suggests the use of Melissa in middle-level ELA classrooms as a means of promoting both allyship and critical discussion about how to remedy difference among their students.

Gender roles and how they define human interaction are also main themes in Melissa. Hermann-Wilmarth and Ryan wrote that many of Melissa's interactions with both her peers and superiors exemplify the struggle of transgender children to challenge the gender binary. When Melissa tells Mrs. Udell, for example, that she wants to play Charlotte in the school play, Mrs. Udell does not take her seriously and even "scowls" at the idea, a response that demonstrates her strong discomfort with such a forward challenge of gender roles. Kelly and Scott, Melissa's best friend and brother, respectively, also have difficulty coming to terms with Melissa's identity as a female, while other kids at school bully her for her girlishness. She challenges the cisnormative expectations of these characters, resulting in either pain and violence, as in the case of her bullies, or eventual acceptance and growth in the case of her family members and close friends. By providing these various examples of how gender expectations govern different interactions and relationships between characters, Melissa pushes its cisgender readers to consider what it means to be excluded from binary gender roles and how to rid themselves of strict gender expectations.

In a 2015 article in The Conversation, PhD candidate in Children's Literature Rebecca Cierazek discussed how Melissa provides transgender children with a relatable narrative. The dichotomy between who Melissa believes herself to be and who others take her as is representative of the identity struggle many transgender kids face that often goes unrecognized in children's literature. Cierazek suggested that by informing parents and kids about what it means to be transgender, Melissa can help eliminate discrimination of LGBTQ children that often stems from fear and ignorance.

Mel Morrow in the Lambia Literary review writes about Alex Gino's Melissa. Morrow writes, the problems that transgender children face both privately and publicly are addressed head-on by Alex Gino in George. During Melissa's transition period, Gino demonstrates these difficulties through Melissa's interaction with various characters. Through these interactions, Gino demonstrates diverse responses to Melissa's transition while gradually leading the characters to accept Melissa's transition.

Morrow believes that the intended reader for Melissa is eight to twelve years old. This age range intelligently removes "sexuality from the identity-formation equation." Melissa breaks the stigmatism that her family and readers may hold that gender expression is correlated with sexuality.

Accolades

Awards 
 2016 Stonewall Book Award: Mike Morgan and Larry Romans Children's Literature Award
 2016 California Book Awards: Juvenile (Gold)
 2016 Lambda Literary Award: LGBT Children's/Young Adult

Nominations 
 2016–2017 Dorothy Canfield Fisher Children's Book Award
 2016 E.B. White Read Aloud Award: Middle Reader
 2016–2017 Georgia Children's Book (Gr. 4-8) Awards: Other Worthwhile Books for Grades 4-8
 2015 Goodreads Choice Award: Best Middle Grade & Children's

See also 
 2015 in literature

References

External links 
 

2015 American novels
2015 LGBT-related literary works
Novels with transgender themes
English-language novels
American LGBT novels
American children's novels
2015 children's books
Children's books with transgender themes
LGBT-related children's novels
2010s LGBT novels
Scholastic Corporation books
Stonewall Book Award-winning works
Censored books
LGBT-related controversies in literature